Koch is a Sino-Tibetan language spoken by the Koch people of India and Bangladesh.

Geographical distribution
Koch is spoken in:

Assam:
Baksa district - Hodi or Koch Mandai
Darrang district - Hodi or Koch Mandai
Dhemaji district - Hodi or Koch Mandai
Goalpara district - Madaci koch, kocha Rabha, Kocho koro, Hodi or Koch Mandai
Lakhimpur district - Hodi or Koch Mandai
Nagaon district - Hodi or Koch Mandai, Kocho koro
Udalguri district - Hodi or Koch Mandai
Sonitpur district - Hodi or Koch Mandai
Bangladesh: Hodi or Koch Mandai and Kocho koro
Bihar: Rajbongshi koch
Meghalaya:
East Khasi hills - Hodi alias Koch Mandai
West Garo Hills district - Kocha rabha or Koch
Tripura: Hodi or Koch Mandai or koch
West Bengal: Rajbongshi koch, Kocha Rabha

Notes

References

Languages of Bangladesh
Sal languages
Languages of Assam
Languages of Meghalaya
Languages of Tripura
Endangered languages of India